was a Japanese Christian who served as a translator and catechist for the Augustine Recollect missionaries. She became tertiary of the Order of Augustinian Recollects.

Life
Born in 1611 near Nagasaki, Magdalene was the daughter of a Christian couple martyred about 1620. With the arrival of the Augustinian Order in 1623, Magdalene served as an interpreter for the friars Francis of Jesus Terrero and Vincent of Saint Anthony Simoens. In 1625, she became a tertiary of the Order of Augustinian Recollects,

Magdalen taught catechism to the young, sought alms for the poor, and encouraged the people in times of persecution. In 1632, the two Augustinian friars, who had been her spiritual counselors, were burned alive. After the martyrdom of her counselors, she apprenticed herself to two other Augustinians, Melchior of Saint Augustine and Martin of Saint Nicholas. When these two friars were also put to death, she turned to Giordano Ansaloni de San Esteban, a Dominican. In 1629, she sought refuge with other Christians in the hills of Nagasaki, where she baptized the young and visited the sick.

Seeing so many apostatize, some time later, attired in her Augustinian habit, Magdalene turned herself into the authorities and declared herself a follower of Jesus Christ. At age 23, she died on October 15, 1634 after thirteen days of torture, suffocated to death and suspended upside down in a pit of offal on a gibbet (tsurushi). In the end, the pit was filled with water and she drowned.

After death, her body was cremated and her ashes scattered in Nagasaki Bay.

She was beatified by Pope John Paul II on February 18, 1981 in Manila, and canonized on October 18, 1987 at Vatican City among the 16 Martyrs of Japan.

Depiction
Though the official picture of Magdalene of Nagasaki shows her wearing an Augustinian habit while holding a palm leaf in her hands and carrying a bag through her elbow, another depiction of her is used by the Dominicans for their own devotion. Instead of the black habit, she is shown wearing a kimono while holding a cross in her hands. One sculpture of her shows that she wears a veil with a crown or halo on her head. More depictions show the differences of her picture such as holding a palm leaf and rosary in separate hands.

See also

Martyrs of Japan

References

External links
Mary Magdalene of Nagasaki canonized (Vatican)

1611 births
1634 deaths
Augustinian nuns
Augustinian saints
Japanese Roman Catholic saints
Japanese Roman Catholic religious sisters and nuns
17th-century Christian saints
17th-century Roman Catholic martyrs
Christian female saints of the Early Modern era
Beatifications by Pope John Paul II
Interpreters